Broadcast on the Triple J radio station to simulcast with the annual three-game rugby league State of Origin series, Australian comedians Roy and HG (played by John Doyle and Greig Pickhaver) provide a commentary of the match at hand. An extension of the duo's This Sporting Life radio program, also on Triple J, Roy and HG's use of comedy makes their sporting calls unique from that provided by other media sources, and has earned a cult following. With the duo's move to Triple M radio in 2009, and the end of This Sporting Life, the State of Origin commentary is currently on hiatus.

History

A unique deviation from the usual format of the Triple J State of Origin coverage occurred in Game One of the 2007 Series, when Roy Slaven was unavailable to be present for the commentary. As a replacement, HG Nelson was joined by former New South Wales player Jason Stevens and Triple J radio personality Scott Dooley. King Wally Otto's pre-game build-up was replaced by Triple J presenter Jason Whalley, dubbed "The Ancient Voice of the Rhomb".

Format

Build-up 

At 7:30pm on the night of a State of Origin match, Triple J interrupts its normal evening broadcasts (Super Request) in New South Wales and Queensland, and the State of Origin coverage begins with a fanfare of horns. A lengthy introduction to State of Origin rugby league is given by "King Wally Otto in the Soundproof Booth" (a pseudonym for well-known Australian voice-over presenter Robbie McGregor). This introduction, which can last for 5 minutes or more, features King Wally Otto enthusiastically reading an elaborate Doyle and Pickhaver script, which more often than not culminates in a list of Former Origin Greats ("F.O.G.s"), and anecdotes about their achievements or foibles. It is also common for Otto to announce a 'theme' for the year's three game series, often to do with current events (such as the 2003 invasion of Iraq). A twist on this was when the 2006 series was heavily "sponsored" by fictitious Lakemba-based car dealership Frosty Lahood Motors Australia.

At the end of Otto's build-up to the game, he usually switches to a rhapsodic introduction for Roy and HG themselves, ending with the question "are you there...HG?" Taking his role of the 'sports announcer' of the pair, HG Nelson thanks King Wally Otto in the Soundproof Booth, welcomes listeners to their State of Origin coverage and provides further build-up to the game at hand. Nelson introduces the State of Origin contest as being played for the "highest principles on the planet"; those principles being "Peace through violence, harmony through brutality and getting everyone to shut-up and behave just like us or they’ll cop a boot up the date [buttocks] and a fist of fives."

During the first few minutes, Nelson's broadcasting partner, "Rampaging" Roy Slaven remains silent until eventually introduced to the airwaves by Nelson. Roy's character, a supposed former player of the game who takes more of an 'expert commentary' role to Nelson's main call, is often restrained with his opening remarks; that is, until his enthusiasm for the game provokes a passionate expression of opinion about the contest to Nelson and the listening audience. The pair talk about the build-up to the game for approximately half an hour, often with Slaven recounting supposed interactions he had with stars of the league (he professes intimate friendships with virtually every current and former player of rugby league). An example of one of these (obviously fictional) exchanges was before the first game of the 2006 series which New South Wales was entering after winning the previous three in a row. With many media commentators declaring the concept of State of Origin dead after such one-sided results, Roy contacted Wally Lewis for his thoughts on the upcoming series, to which he replied "oh, are they still playing that?"

National anthem 

At approximately 8:00pm the players enter the field and line up for the singing of the Australian national anthem; an occasion which provides one of Roy and HG's most infamous twists on traditional sports commentary. As the television pictures show footage of a vocalist singing "Advance Australia Fair," the Triple J coverage completely replaces the song with Lionel Rose's 1969 song "I Thank You." The choice of this song probably is due to the opening lyrics "When a boy becomes a man..." (signifying young players 'stepping up' to the challenge of State of Origin football) as well as the inherent violence associated with the former-boxer, Rose. The Lionel Rose song is faded out by Roy and HG when they sense the real singer is wrapping up their performance (usually after the first chorus of "I Thank You"), with Roy and HG invariably praising the singer for a fantastic performance. Before the beginning of State of Origin I 2008, because the buildup to the game had been quite emotional as Jack Gibson had recently died, a violin solo of "Waltzing Matilda" was played during the national anthem, with both Roy and HG applauding the 'beautiful' rendition.

Game commentary 

Compared to the more traditional commentary on Channel 9 and ABC Radio's Grandstand, Roy and HG are often less restrained in their criticism of players and teams. This feature of their call may be off-putting for certain fans who are sensitive to hearing players in their team criticised (being called a "goose", etc.), but is generally taken in the humorous way it is intended. The duo's commentary, and particularly Slaven's, often features over the top reactions to the game at hand, such as calling for entire teams of players to be sacked after losses, or even questioning whether losing teams will ever win another match in the future.

Though Doyle was born in New South Wales, and both currently reside within the state, this gives seemingly little influence to any commentary 'bias'. Roy and HG are also quick to relish the more 'unsavoury' actions of players on the field which are ignored or downplayed by more traditional commentators. This includes spitting, dacking, wedgies, gouging, groping, pig-rooting, fighting and roughhousing in general.

Roy and HG's State of Origin commentary is also noteworthy for the use of nicknames to refer to many of players on the field, rather than their surnames. While standard, well-known nicknames such as "Sticky" Ricky Stuart and "Mad Dog" MacDougall are used, the duo are renowned for their creation and use of more obscure 'running joke'-type nicknames about players. A partial list of nicknames is presented below:

Player nicknames 

{| border="1"
! colspan="3"  style="text-align:center; background:#906; color:white;"| Queensland State of Origin player nicknames
|-
! style="background:#906; color:white;"| Player name!! style="background:#906; color:white;"| Roy and HG nickname !! style="background:#906; color:white;"| Reason for nickname
|-
! Gary Belcher
| Snakey Substances || In reference to Belcher's running style, which would often be used to slide through the opposition's defensive line in a snake-like manner.
|-
! Martin Bella
| The Squirrel Gripper || In reference to Bella gaining a match winning last minute penalty conversion which was awarded because Des Hasler retaliated after Bella had grabbed and squeezed his testicles during a tackle. See "squirrel grip" elsewhere in this article.
|-
! Steven Bell
| Ding Dong Bell || A play on the word "bell" and his last nam.
|-
! Wayne Bennett
| Skeletor || A reference to his taciturn manner. Also called "Supercoach Bennett".
|-
! Petero Civoniceva
| Fridge and a Freezer || Rhyming slang with Civoniceva's actual surname. Roy and HG also usually intentionally mispronounce his surname as "Siv-ee-ya-see-na" and sometimes introduce other variations such as "Petrol SeventyCentsALitre" and "Petero SecondReceiver".  Also nicknamed "The Rear Admiral" from his habit of turning his back to the defensive line when he is about to be tackled.
|-
! Petero Civoniceva
| The Second Keel || Reference to Steve Price's nickname of the pair being the direction of the Queensland pack.
|-
! Mark Coyne
| The Two Dollar Coit || A play on his surname's pronunciation, coit is another slang term used by Roy and HG to mean anus. His older brother Peter has been referred to as "One Dollar Coit".
|-
! Michael Crocker
| Betty Crocker || Reference to the fact that he shares his surname with the famous cookbook brand.
|-
! Brett Dallas
| Debbie Does || Named after the 1978 pornographic film Debbie Does Dallas.
|-
! Brett Dallas
| The Grassy Knoll || U.S. President John F. Kennedy was assassinated in the city of Dallas. One of the conspiracy theories going around was that the shot was fired from behind a grassy knoll close to the motorcade route. Dallas also had a habit of bursting into the open out of nowhere, a fact which Roy and HG claim is similar to the unexpected nature of Kennedy's assassination.
|-
! Greg Dowling
| Dish-Head DowlingWing-Nut Dowling || The name "Dish-Head" implies that Dowling's face is concave as his nose has been broken. The name "Wing-Nut" refers to the fact that Dowling has large ears.
|-
! John Doyle
| Roy || John Doyle is the real name of the actor behind the Roy Slaven character, so the duo nicknamed the rugby league player accordingly.
|-
! Andrew Gee
| Older Than His Grandpa || Due to his age, Roy and HG would often refer to him as being "Older Than His Grandpa".
|-
! Trevor Gillmeister
| Chock-a-Block Full of Angry Pills  || Gillmeister was a player who seemed especially fired up around Origin time and Roy and HG's explanation for this was the consumption of "angry pills" in the dressing room just before kick-off.
|-
! Michael Hancock
| Three Knees || Roy and HG hypothesised that Hancock used his large "middle leg" to his advantage in the game of rugby league, such as slowing play-the-balls by holding down opposing players with it when making tackles. He was also sometimes referred to as "Tripod".
|-
! Ben Hannant
| The Ambitious Walk || HG often comments that Hannant is a very slow runner. When Hannant takes a hit-up, HG will often comment "God he's slow isn't he?" Variations of the nickname include "The Ambitious Walker" and "The Hiker".
|-
! Paul Hauff
| The Clip Clop Club || Nickname derived from pronunciation of his surname (i.e. horse hoof).
|-
! Tony Hearn
| The Penalty Puller || Roy and HG regarded Hearn as a player who frequently faked injury to fool the referee into penalising the New South Wales team. Later in his career, Roy and HG referred to Hearn as a mentor-like figure who coaches young players how to best "pull penalties" in State of Origin matches. In his 1996 book Petrol, Bait, Ammo & Ice, HG spuriously claimed "[Hearn] is the only player to be able to lay on a headbutt at State of Origin level and then pull the following penalty when the all-in broke out".
|-
! Ben Ikin
| Tina Turner || Derived from the homophonic qualities of Ikin and Ike & Tina Turner.
|-
! Adrian Lam
| Baa Baa Lam || Nicknamed Baa Baa due to Lam being his surname.
|-
! Martin Lang
| The Ungrateful Head || The head of Martin Lang, who ran with an erratic style, would be violently and spectacularly whiplashed backwards after a collision with a tackling opponent.
|-
! Allan Langer
| Deborah Kerr || Actress Deborah Kerr starred opposite Yul Brynner in the 1956 film The King and I. This nickname is derived from Langer's on-field partnership with Brisbane Broncos and Maroons five-eighth Wally Lewis, who is nicknamed "The King." The duo often referred to Lewis as "K.W. Lewis".
|-
! Gary Larson
| The Far Side || Larson shares his name as the cartoonist responsible for the popular comic strip, The Far Side.
|-
! Darren Lockyer
| Silk || Reference to Lockyer's ability to glide smoothly through the defensive line.
|-
! Mal Meninga
| Chicken George ||
|-
! Adam Mogg
| Moggball || Mogg's debut Origin match was the second game of the 2006 series, which was being played at the same time as the soccer World Cup. Mogg scored two tries in an unexpected Queensland thrashing which led Roy to declare "you can talk about Wogball, but this is "Moggball"."
|-
! Julian O'Neill
| The Poo in the Shoe || O'Neill, who has a history of off-field misconduct including two DUI charges and urinating under casino blackjack tables on two separate occasions, was involved in a 1999 pre-season incident which led to him being banned from a Dubbo hotel. Following years of personal and professional turmoil, O'Neill trashed the Dubbo hotel room by smearing the walls with faeces. A direct quote from the horse's mouth describing a further bad deed from the night was "Hey Schlossie, I just shat in your shoe." 
|-
! Julian O'Neill
| The Golden Shower Boy || Used in reference to O'Neill urinating under a Jupiters Casino card table on two occasions.
|-
! Robbie O'Davis
| Roids O'Davis || Nicknamed after O'Davis was suspended for 22 weeks early in his career after it was discovered he had used anabolic steroids.
|-
! Steve Price
| Price Attack || Named after the Australian discount haircare and beauty chain, Roy and HG would make the "woo woo woo!" noise of a storefront siren whenever Price would take a hit up.
|-
! Steve Price
| The Keel || Roy and HG hailed Price as the direction of the Queensland pack and later awarded Petero Civoniceva with the title of "Second Keel". The pair lamented that New South Wales would have no keel while Queensland had two.
|-
! Wendell Sailor
| Ding Dong Dell || Also, at one time, Roy and HG would shout "HELLO SAILOR!" every time Wendell was passed the ball.
|-
! Clinton Schifcofske
| Shkkkkkk || Just about everyone in Australian rugby league media pronounces Schficofske's name differently and few got it right (it's pronounced "Shif-oss-key") and his nickname was a play on this. Roy and HG also deliberately mispronounce his name as "Shiv-cough-skee". 
|-
! Dale Shearer
| The 180B Man || Named after a late 1970s car model, Roy and HG would remark how Shearer "offers so many options on the park he's like a Datsun 180B". An extension of this joke was that Shearer offered "too many options", which led to no action because of indecision.
|-
! Matt Sing
| On Song || Nicknamed so due to his surname, Sing.
|-
! Cameron Smith
| Call-Me-Cam|| Smith, in the first half his career, preferred to be known as "Cam" rather than his full given name.
|-
! Darren Smith
| Cheese and Chives || Smiths Chips is a large manufacturer of potato chips in Australia.
|-
! Jason Smith
| Salt and Vinegar || Jason is the brother of Darren Smith (see above).
|-
! Dan Stains
| The Underpants || Roy and HG began calling Stains "Underpant Stains" after suggesting that no matter how the Blues might wash, they just can't get those "Dan Stains" out. This was soon shortened to "The Underpants."
|-
! Brent Tate
| Show Us Ya Date Tate || Roy and HG were instrumental in popularising the usage of the slang term "date", which means anus. After being tackled, Tate occasionally rises to play the ball after lying on his back with his legs open and inadvertently pointing towards the camera. After scoring two tries in Game  III of the 2003 State of Origin series, Roy and HG proclaimed "everybody's talking Tate!" This would prove to be a popular phrase which would be modified to "Nobody’s Talking Tate" during less impressive performances.
|-
!Sam Thaiday
|The Personality
|Also "The Character" for his wild hair and rollickg take ups with hair and knees flying.
|-
! Brad Thorn
| Thorn in the Side || A reference to his surname.
|-
! Lote Tuqiri
| Plum Daiquiri || A nickname derived from Lote's unusual Fijian surname. Another version is "Strawberry Daiquiri".
|-
! Kerrod Walters
| Prune || Because the Walters brothers were "fruit of the same loins",  each got a "fruity" moniker
|-
! Kevin Walters
| Cumquat || The brother of Kerrod. (see above)
|-
! Steve Walters
| Quince || The brother of Kerrod and Kevin, completing the fruit motif.
|-
! Shane Webcke
| BigPond || Telstra BigPond is a popular web provider in Australia.
|}

In addition to the players, Roy and HG frequently refer to two former top grade referees: Kelvin Jeffes and Moghseen Jadwat, ironically describing them as the two best officials ever to grace the sport (in actuality, Jadwat's top-grade career was decidedly short (1997-8) whilst Jeffes has only controlled one Origin fixture). This is in contrast to Roy and HG's typical opinions of refereeing staff (e.g. Bill Harrigan, which is often vocally critical beyond the norm for sports commentators).

 Other sayings 

Roy and HG's commentary also makes use of a number of sayings which are infrequently used by the majority of rugby league broadcasters.

 Play of game 

 "Chilli on the stick" - Analogous to the saying "rubbing salt in the wound", "chilli on the stick" is referred to by Roy and HG when a team already trailing on the scoreboard is further humiliated by the opposition scoring subsequent tries. Roy and HG metaphorically refer to the winning team grabbing a cricket stump, removing the brass ferrules, then applying chilli and inserting it "in, out, in, out" of the losing team's date (a slang word for anus).
 "Defusing a bomb" - a player (usually the fullback) catching an opposing team's bomb in the in-goal area, and thus giving their team a 20-metre restart. This saying is especially used in high-pressure situations where there is a contest from an opposing player for the mark.
 "Face massage" - pressure put on the face of a tackled player by the palm of an opponent.
 "Half Dream Room" - a reference to the metaphorical state or "room" entered by a player after being hit sufficiently hard in the head (by, for example, a Nut Merchant) to produce severe concussion without total unconsciousness.
 "Hospital pass" - a pass to a team-mate who is closely marked by another player. This ensures that the player is swiftly tackled (often with great force because of the defender's available time to prepare) soon after catching the ball.
 "Johnny on the spot" - a lucky player. This saying is usually reserved to describe a someone who scores because of being in the right place at the right time to receive a pass from a player who had done more work to manufacture the try.
 "Nut Merchant" - a player renowned for employing the head butt. Or, in HG Nelson's words, to "lay on a bit of nut with a glorious headbutt".
 "Parting the Buttocks and Shoving the Head Up" - a player entering the scrum.
 "Pig Rooting" - the process of a player bucking wildly to extricate himself from a tackle and thus play the ball more quickly. The pig rooter is the antithesis of the white flag merchant. Named for the resemblance of the act to a wild pig rooting around for nourishment in the dirt, snout down and bum up.
 "Pillow" - usually used as a verb, "to pillow" (also "to powder" or "to talc") is to perform a poor piece of rugby league through a perceived lack of courage, mental strength or intelligence (often all three). Spectacular examples can be followed by Roy roaring "PILLOW POWDER TALC." Also used as a noun, with a certain player referred to as "The Pillow with Feet."
 "Reception committee" - terminology for a group of defending players who 'greet' an advancing player with a tackle.
 "Shut up shop" - a comment about a team in a leading position, who no longer seem to be actively trying to score points. They appear to be simply waiting for the clock to run out, and the game to end (e.g. "the Maroons have shut up shop for the night").
"Squirrel grip" - referring to a player grabbing an opponent's testicles, as a diligent squirrel might tightly grasp precious nuts for the winter. Also ponderously referred to as "the Christmas handshake" and "the Nairobi night-time grope" by HG Nelson in the "squirrel grip" description in his 1996 book Petrol, Bait, Ammo & Ice.
 "Surrendered tackle" - see "white flag merchant", below.
 "Traditional softening-up period" - The first 10 minutes of the match in which the aim is to hurt or 'soften up' to opposition as much as possible.
 "Turtled" - A tackling style where more than one opponent lift the ball carrier in such a way that they end up on their back like a turtle trapped on its shell.
 Whistle in the pocket - a comment about a referee who is, in the eyes of Roy and HG, electing not to penalise players for breaking the rules of the game (e.g. "the referee has put the whistle in his pocket").
 "White flag merchant" - someone who ‘surrenders’ to allow their opponents to easily tackle them. Roy Slaven is a strong believer that this should be stomped out of the game ("I HATE it!"), with suggested punishments for white flag merchants being as extreme as an instant life ban from playing the code. Brett Hodgson has been accused of being a white flag merchant during Roy and HG's State of Origin commentary.

 Miscellaneous 

 "Advertising" - Due to the ABC Charter, presenters are not allowed to voice support for commercial organisations. Pickhaver and Doyle also show an aversion to legitimately mentioning the names of corporations who have bought naming rights for venues and events (see "Stadia", below). Comically, Nelson also twists the reality of the sponsors who have their logos painted on the grass of the field. When players have been tackled on painted sections of grass (especially the red Harvey Norman logos), Slaven often refers to the players as being "tackled on the Triple J signage." Alternatively at various stages throughout the late 1990s both Roy and HG would comment that the legitimate sponsor FAI merely translated to Triple J in French.
 "Stadia" - Roy and HG usually avoid mentioning the sponsors' names during their broadcast, calling Suncorp Stadium "The Cauldron" (or its traditional name, Lang Park), and calling the then-Telstra Stadium (the venue which hosted the 2000 Olympics; formerly known as Stadium Australia and now as ANZ Stadium) "The Grand Old Girl" (or sometimes "The G.O.G.").
 "Surrendered Tackles" - Roy quite often voices his opinions of "surrendered tackles," in which a player either falls over accidentally, or dives before getting tackled by the opposition. Roy believes this should be given a penalty to the opposing team.
 "Ted Mulry" - Ron Palmer, who is the head trainer to the New South Wales Blues throughout most of the 1990s and 2000s bears a strong resemblance to Australian singer Ted Mulry (best known for the hit "Jump in My Car" with his band the Ted Mulry Gang). When the doppelganger trainer enters the field and is seen in the background of the TV coverage, Roy and HG often remark at their amazement that Ted Mulry is now involved in rugby league. Palmer is aware of the nickname and appears to take it in a good nature.
 "The kids" - A theme that Roy and HG often return to with their State of Origin commentary is attempting to create interest in Rugby League with school-aged children. Impressive plays (as well as unsavoury acts of violence, etc.) are often described by Roy and HG as something that will "get the kiddies interested in Rugby League." Slaven, in particular, is a proponent of asking parents of "stupid" kids if they have considered Rugby League as a future path for their children (citing players such as Willie Mason as role models).
 "They can't run without legs" - An example of Roy Slaven's expert commentary, said when a player is 'cut down' to the ground by being tackled around the legs. This saying is also modified to "they can't run without a head," when a head-high tackle is attempted. Another variation: "they don't know where to run without their heads".
 "Triple J Card Table" - Roy and HG often allude to calling the game from a temporary card table, set up near the sideline of the field when in fact they are calling from a radio studio, watching the same pictures that are broadcast to the television audience. This is also a reference to legendary rugby league player and broadcaster Frank Hyde, who started calling games on radio in the 1950s, from a card table set up on the side of the field.

 Relationship with television coverage 

By their own account, Roy and HG's commentary of the match is broadcast live from a card table adjacent to the halfway line of the playing field. In reality, their call is very much centred around the pictures that Channel 9 broadcast on their TV coverage with, for example, the duo being unsure of who won a penalty from the referee until the TV pictures change to a shot of the restart of play happening. Roy and HG use this aspect to add further comedy to their commentary, for example by calling the Channel 9 commentary team "men eating ice cream cones" for their unnecessary use of hand-held microphones during studio broadcasts. Another memorable example of the TV-centric flow of Slaven and Nelson's commentary was during the 2004 series when Channel 9 introduced the "Skycam" camera-on-wires which 'hovered' above the players' heads. This expensive technology, which had notably poor picture quality, often could not keep up with the flow of play was over-used by Channel 9 during the broadcast, was frequently blasted by Roy and HG for disorientating them with the "telecast from the lunar surface." Slaven and Nelson also give back-handed criticism to Channel 9's low-brow "football entertainment" show The Footy Show'', sarcastically remarking what a "funny show" it is.

Digital divide 

Though many listen to the call without accompaniment, HG Nelson's introductory comments always invite listeners to "tickle your television to the league channel down your end of the swamp, turn down the sound and turn up Triple J." Since the early 2000s, the spread of digital television throughout Australia has caused some technical issues for the Triple J State of Origin broadcast. Roy and HG's commentary had previously arrived to viewers approximately in sync with the television pictures (although generally, regional viewers suffered a short delay between the radio and television signals). The digital delay that came with the introduction of digital TV created a noticeable gap between the analogue radio broadcast and the slower digital TV signal. HG Nelson had to preclude their broadcast that "unfortunately we live with the digital divide, and there’s nothing we can do about it." In later years, however, Nelson would add that digital TV viewers should try tuning into their online stream via the Triple J website, which has its own slight delay behind the airwaves. Therefore, it is recommended that analogue TV viewers listen to the analogue radio broadcast, and digital TV viewers stream the commentary from the Triple J website.

External links 
 Roy and HG's recount of the 1988 Rugby League grand final featuring vintage audio of their 1988 Balmain Tigers versus Canterbury-Bankstown Bulldogs commentary
 Blog post about the creation of this Wikipedia article indicating information that was transcribed from live radio broadcasts.

References

Australian comedy
Rugby League State of Origin
Triple J programs